Dillon Barna (born September 29, 1987 in Phoenix, Arizona) is an American soccer player who last played for Ventura County Fusion in the USL Premier Development League.

Career

College and Amateur
Barna attended Mountain Pointe High School in Phoenix, Arizona, where he earned numerous local honors, and played college soccer at Westmont College in Santa Barbara, California. He started all 72 games of his collegiate career for the Warriors, and earned all-GSAC honors as a sophomore, junior and senior.

During his college years Barna also played three seasons with Ventura County Fusion in the USL Premier Development League, helping them to the PDL Championship in 2009.

Professional
Barna signed his first professional contract in 2010 when he was signed by AC St. Louis of the USSF Division 2 Professional League. He made his professional debut on April 22, 2010 in a game against Portland Timbers, and scored his first professional goal on May 8 in a game against the Rochester Rhinos.

Barna was released by St. Louis when the team folded at the end of the 2010 USSF Division 2 Professional League season; having been unable to secure a professional contract elsewhere, he returned to play for Ventura County Fusion in the USL Premier Development League in 2011.

Honors

Ventura County Fusion
USL Premier Development League Champions (1): 2009

References

External links
 AC St. Louis bio
 2010 InfoSport Soccer player profile

1987 births
Living people
American soccer players
AC St. Louis players
Westmont Warriors men's soccer players
Ventura County Fusion players
Soccer players from Phoenix, Arizona
USSF Division 2 Professional League players
USL League Two players
Association football defenders